Mika Sinuhe Wallinheimo (born March 9, 1972 in Jyväskylä, Finland) is a Finnish politician and former professional ice hockey goaltender. As the last team he represented JYP in the SM-liiga. After his sporting career he entered politics and was elected to the Parliament of Finland as an MP for the National Coalition Party in the 2011 election and reelected in 2015 and 2019. His parents derived his name Sinuhe from the protagonist of the novel The Egyptian.

International play

Wallinheimo was selected to the 2006 Men's World Ice Hockey Championships as the third goaltender. Wallinheimo was dropped from the roster when Antero Niittymäki joined the team, but he made his international debut in a practice game against Denmark. In the 2006–07 season, Wallinheimo represented Finland on the Euro Hockey Tour, being chosen best goaltender in both the Ceska Pojistovna Cup and Karjala Tournament.

Amateur career

Wallinheimo played for the University of Denver, becoming a league-wide fan favorite for his unusual fan interactions during stoppages of play.

Awards and honors

Career statistics

External links
 Jatkoaika.com player profile

References 

1972 births
Living people
Sportspeople from Jyväskylä
National Coalition Party politicians
Members of the Parliament of Finland (2011–15)
Members of the Parliament of Finland (2015–19)
Members of the Parliament of Finland (2019–23)
Denver Pioneers men's ice hockey players
Färjestad BK players
Finnish ice hockey goaltenders
Hershey Bears players
JYP Jyväskylä players
Lukko players
Mississippi Sea Wolves players
Mobile Mysticks players
Springfield Falcons players